René Rudolf Jeandel (11 July 1924 – 8 January 2018) was a French cross-country and Nordic combined skier who competed in the 1948 Winter Olympics.

References

1924 births
2018 deaths
French male cross-country skiers
French male Nordic combined skiers
Olympic cross-country skiers of France
Olympic Nordic combined skiers of France
Cross-country skiers at the 1948 Winter Olympics
Nordic combined skiers at the 1948 Winter Olympics
20th-century French people